Robert H. Herman (December 19, 1925 – December 25, 1980) was an American author, biochemist, nutritionist, physician, soldier, and scientist.  Herman was a gastroenterologist and expert in human nutrition with interests in food intolerance, gastrointestinal enzymes, inborn errors of metabolism, metabolic control, and lactase deficiency.

Education 
Herman earned a Bachelor of Science degree from the Illinois Institute of Technology, a Medical Doctor degree from the University of Illinois College of Medicine in Chicago, and served his medical internship at Walter Reed Army Medical Center in Washington D.C.  Herman was married to Yaye F. Tokuyama Herman, his lifetime scientific collaborator, who he met while both were students at the University of Chicago and she was a member of the Women's Army Corps.

Military service
Herman served in World War II as an enlisted person for two years, and spent most of his life on active duty in the United States Army Medical Corps. He played an important role in the development of  one of the most advanced military nutrition and metabolism medical research units of its time, the U.S. Army Medical and Nutrition Research Laboratory, first at Fitzsimmons Army Medical Center in Aurora, Colorado, and later at the Letterman Army Institute of Research of the Letterman Army Medical Center in San Francisco California.  At the Letterman Army Institute of Research, Herman held the rank of Colonel in the US Army and served as the Director of the Department of Medicine.

Theoretical biology
In 1980, Herman edited Principles of Metabolic Control in Mammalian Systems with co-authors Robert M. Cohen and Pamela D. McNamara of the University of Pennsylvania. In chapter one, entitled The Principles of Metabolic Control, Herman advanced the following five "Fundamental Theorems of Theoretical Biology."

 "The basic principles of chemistry and physics govern the chemical reactions and related processes that occur within the cell."
 "...the sequential acquisition of biological function by proteins and nucleic acids is a reflection of the evolutionary sequence of development."
"...the continued synthesis and degradation of proteins and enzymes constitutes the life process by enabling the metabolic network to achieve negative entropy and remain in a far-from-equilibrium condition."  
"...all disease is a consequence of at least one abnormality of at least one of biochemical function."
"...psychiatric disorders and mental illness have a biochemical basis, however poorly understood."

These theorems were discussed in the  chapters in the book, including the final chapter written by Herman and Robert H. Cohn entitled, "The Biochemical Basis of Disease."

American Society for Nutrition
Herman published numerous articles in American Journal of Clinical Nutrition, served as the editor in chief of the American Journal of Clinical Nutrition, and died while in office in December 1980. Herman was also apparently the immediate past president of the American Society for Nutrition at the time of his death.

Awards
In 1981, The American Society for Nutrition  awarded Herman posthumously the McCollum Award, fan award or clinical investigators whose research has makes important contributions to clinical nutrition in areas related to the biochemical and metabolic aspects of human nutrition. In 1980, Robert H. Herman was awarded the United States Army Legion of Merit.

References 

1925 deaths
1980 deaths
Physicians from Illinois
American biochemists
Scientists from Chicago
Medical journal editors
Military personnel from Illinois
Recipients of the Legion of Merit
20th-century American male writers
American nutritionists
American gastroenterologists
United States Army colonels
United States Army Medical Corps officers
20th-century American physicians
Illinois Institute of Technology alumni
United States Army personnel of World War II
University of Illinois College of Medicine alumni